Vernon Eugene Clark (born September 7, 1944) is a retired admiral who served as the Chief of Naval Operations (CNO) of the United States Navy. He retired on July 22, 2005, making his tenure of five years the second-longest serving CNO behind Arleigh Burke. He currently sits on the board of directors of Raytheon and SRI International. In November 2009, he was selected along with former Secretary of Veterans Affairs Togo West by Defense Secretary Robert Gates to lead the military investigation into the Fort Hood massacre.

Early life and education
Clark was born in Sioux City, Iowa, and grew up in the states of Nebraska, Missouri and Illinois. Clark graduated from Evangel College and earned a Master of Business Administration degree from the University of Arkansas. He attended Officer Candidate School and received his commission in August 1968.

Career
 

As a lieutenant, he commanded . After being selected for flag rank, Clark commanded Carl Vinson Battle Group/Cruiser-Destroyer Group 3, Second Fleet, and United States Atlantic Fleet.

Ashore, Clark first served as special assistant to the director of the Systems Analysis Division in the Office of the Chief of Naval Operations. He later completed assignments as the administrative assistant to the Deputy Chief of Naval Operations (Surface Warfare) and as the administrative aide to the Vice Chief of Naval Operations. He served as head of the Cruiser-Destroyer Combat Systems Requirements Section and force anti-submarine warfare officer for the commander of Naval Surface Force, Atlantic Fleet, and he directed the Joint Staff's Crisis Action Team for Operation Desert Shield and Operation Desert Storm.

Clark's first flag assignment was at the United States Transportation Command (TRANSCOM), where he was director of plans and policy (J5) and financial management and analysis  (J8). While commanding the Carl Vinson Battle Group, he deployed to the Persian Gulf and later served as the Deputy Commander, Joint Task Force Southwest Asia. Clark has also served as the Deputy and Chief of Staff, United States Atlantic Fleet; the Director of Operations (J3) and subsequently Director, of the Joint Staff. Clark became the 27th Chief of Naval Operations on July 21, 2000, relieving Jay L. Johnson.

Clark now serves on the board of directors of Raytheon Company, Rolls-Royce North America, SRI International, Horizon Lines, the Armed Forces YMCA, and is on the world board of governors of the USO. He serves as a senior advisor with Booz Allen Hamilton, the Defense Policy Board, the advisory boards of Fleishman-Hillard, Computer Science Corporation, the Comptroller General's advisory board of the GAO, and the executive committee of Military Ministry. In addition, he is currently a distinguished professor at Regent University in Virginia Beach, Virginia. Clark teaches in the Robertson School of Government and the School of Business & Leadership and is a member of the Regent's board of trustees. He is also a member of the Board of Visitors at Air University.

Awards and decorations

Since his retirement, Clark has been honored with the Eisenhower Award from the Business Executives for National Security and the Distinguished Sea Service Award from the Naval Order of the United States.

Clark was elected to the board of directors of Raytheon in December 2005 and the board of directors of SRI International in March 2007.

References

External links

This article incorporates text in the public domain from the U.S. Department of Defense.

 
 

1944 births
Living people
People from Sioux City, Iowa
Assemblies of God people
Evangel University alumni
Military personnel from Iowa
United States Navy officers
University of Arkansas alumni
Recipients of the Legion of Merit
United States Navy admirals
Recipients of the Coast Guard Distinguished Service Medal
Recipients of the Air Force Distinguished Service Medal
Recipients of the Distinguished Service Medal (US Army)
Recipients of the Navy Distinguished Service Medal
Recipients of the Defense Distinguished Service Medal
Chiefs of Naval Operations
Raytheon Company people
Directors of SRI International
Regent University faculty